Pomacea sinamarina is a species of freshwater snail in the Ampullariidae family. It was first described in 1792 by Jean Guillaume Bruguière as Bulimus sinamarinus. Its distribution includes French Guiana and Suriname.

References 

sinamarina
Freshwater snails
Molluscs of South America
Gastropods described in 1792